This is a list of people who served as Lord Lieutenant of Anglesey. Since 1761, all Lord Lieutenants have also been Custos Rotulorum of Anglesey. The office was abolished on 31 March 1974.

Lord Lieutenants of Anglesey to 1974
see Lord Lieutenant of Wales before 1694''
Charles Talbot, 1st Duke of Shrewsbury 31 May 1694 – 10 March 1696
Charles Gerard, 2nd Earl of Macclesfield 10 March 1696 – 5 November 1701
William Stanley, 9th Earl of Derby 18 June 1702 – 5 November 1702
Hugh Cholmondeley, 1st Earl of Cholmondeley 2 December 1702 – 4 September 1713
Other Windsor, 2nd Earl of Plymouth 4 September 1713 – 21 October 1714
Hugh Cholmondeley, 1st Earl of Cholmondeley 21 October 1714 – 18 January 1725
George Cholmondeley, 2nd Earl of Cholmondeley 7 April 1725 – 7 May 1733
George Cholmondeley, 3rd Earl of Cholmondeley 14 June 1733 – 25 October 1760
Sir Nicholas Bayly, 2nd Baronet 25 November 1761 – 1 August 1782
Henry Bayly Paget, 1st Earl of Uxbridge 1 August 1782 – 13 March 1812
Henry Paget, 1st Marquess of Anglesey 28 April 1812 – 29 April 1854
Henry Paget, 2nd Marquess of Anglesey 18 May 1854 – 7 February 1869
William Owen Stanley 2 March 1869 – 24 February 1884
Richard Davies 1 April 1884 – 27 October 1896
Sir Richard Henry Williams-Bulkeley, 12th Baronet 30 November 1896 – 7 July 1942
Charles Paget, 6th Marquess of Anglesey 24 August 1942 – 21 February 1947
Sir Richard Harry David Williams-Bulkeley, 13th Baronet 5 August 1947 – 31 March 1974†

† Became the first Lord Lieutenant of Gwynedd  on 1 April 1974

Deputy Lieutenants

Richard Bennett, Esq 19 February 1901

References

 

 The Lord-Lieutenants Order 1973 (1973/1754)

1974 disestablishments in Wales
Anglesey
Anglesey